For the British science-fiction TV series Doctor Who, List of Doctor Who episodes may refer to:

 List of Doctor Who episodes (1963–1989), a list of the 1963–1989 episodes and 1996 film of Doctor Who
 List of Doctor Who episodes (2005–present), a list of the episodes starting from 2005 of Doctor Who

Series overview

See also 
 List of Doctor Who Christmas and New Year's specials, a list of Doctor Who episodes which were Christmas or New Year's Day specials
 List of supplementary Doctor Who episodes, a list of supplementary Doctor Who episodes

References